Unchained Love is a 2022 Chinese streaming television series directed by Wu Qiang and starring Dylan Wang, Chen Yuqi, Peter Ho, and Zeng Li. The series began airing on iQiyi from December 27, 2022.

Synopsis
In the ancient Daye dynasty, Xiao Duo fakes being an eunuch and lurks in the royal court for years in order to find the murderer of his brother.

When the Emperor passes away, Bu Yinlou is forced to sacrifice herself for the former ruler, but is saved by Xiao Duo.

After defeating Empress Rong'an, Murong Gaogong inherits the throne, but different parties are still secretly vying for the throne. In such a dangerous imperial court, Xiao Duo and Bu Yinlou find themselves falling in love.

Cast

Main 
 Dylan Wang as Xiao Duo
 The Chief of the Zhaoding Division, a fake eunuch.
 Chen Yuqi as Bu Yinlou
 A court lady .
 Peter Ho as Murong Gaogong
 The new Emperor.
 Zeng Li as Empress Rong'an
 The Dowager Empress.

Supporting 
 He Nan as Tong Yun
 Bu Yinlou's handmaiden.
 Wang Lixin as Cao Chunang
 The Deputy Chief of the Zhaoding Division.

Production and release 
 On September 14, 2022, the first trailer was released.
 On December 20, 2022, the series obtained the "web-distributed series" license from China National Radio and Television Administration.
 On December 23, 2022, it was announced that the release date was set for December 27, 2022.

References

External links
 
  (on iQiyi)
2022 Chinese television series debuts
Television shows based on Chinese novels
IQIYI original programming
Chinese comedy-drama television series
Costume drama television series